Charles Guy Pym (11 February 1841 – 12 November 1918) was a British Conservative Party politician.

Charles Guy Pym was born in Willian, the younger son of Rev. William Pym and Sophie Gambier. His grandfather Francis Pym had been MP for Bedfordshire.

Charles Pym was educated at Rossall School. He was Member of Parliament (MP) for Bedford from 1895 to 1906. He was a Grand Councillor in the Primrose League.

He died aged 77.

References

External links 
 

1841 births
1918 deaths
Conservative Party (UK) MPs for English constituencies
People from North Hertfordshire District
People educated at Rossall School
UK MPs 1895–1900
UK MPs 1900–1906